"I'll Be Coming Back for More" is a song written by Curly Putman and Sterling Whipple, and recorded by American country music artist T. G. Sheppard.  It was released in November 1979 as the third single from the album 3/4 Lonely.  The song was Sheppard's fourth number one on the country chart.   The single stayed at number one for two weeks and spent a total of eleven weeks on the chart.

Chart performance

Year-end charts

References

T. G. Sheppard songs
1979 singles
Songs written by Curly Putman
Song recordings produced by Buddy Killen
Warner Records singles
Curb Records singles
1979 songs
Songs written by Sterling Whipple